The men's track time trial in Cycling at the 2000 Summer Olympics was a time trial race in which each of the sixteen cyclists attempted to set the fastest time for four laps (1 kilometre) of the track. The race was held on Saturday, September 16 at the Dunc Gray Velodrome. For the first time since 1896, a nation had more than one cyclist: Germany had two. The event was won by Jason Queally of Great Britain, the nation's first victory in the men's track time trial (and first medal in the event since 1948). Stefan Nimke's silver was the first medal for Germany since 1936 (though the United Team of Germany, East Germany, and West Germany had each won medals). Shane Kelly, the 1992 silver medalist from Australia, became the fifth and last man to win multiple medals in the event with his bronze.

Background

This was the 18th appearance of the event, which had previously been held in 1896 and every Games since 1928. For the first time, a women's track time trial event was held as well. Both the men's and women's versions would be cancelled after the 2004 Games, however.

The returning cyclists from 1996 were fourth-place finisher Soeren Lausberg of Germany, sixth-place finisher Grzegorz Krejner of Poland, seventh-place finisher Dimitrios Georgalis of Greece, and non-finisher Shane Kelly of Australia. Kelly had taken silver in 1992, won the world championship in 1995, and set the world record in 1995; he had been favored in 1996 but his foot slipped from his toe clip. Kelly won the world championship again in 1996 and 1997, coming in second to Arnaud Tournant of France in 1998 and 1999. Kelly and Tournant were the favorites in Sydney.

The Czech Republic made its debut in the men's track time trial, though Czechoslovakia has appeared before. France made its 18th appearance, the only nation to have competed at every appearance of the event.

Competition format

The event was a time trial on the track, with each cyclist competing separately to attempt to achieve the fastest time. Each cyclist raced one kilometre from a standing start.

Records

The following were the world and Olympic records prior to the competition.

Jason Queally broke the Olympic record with a time of 1:01.609. Stefan Nimke also beat the old Olympic record, but raced after Queally and did not beat his new mark.

Schedule

All times are Australian Eastern Standard Time (UTC+10)

Results

Lausberg was the best of the first 12 cyclists. Queally went 13th, breaking the Olympic record and setting a time that nobody else would beat. Nimke rode after Queally, moving into second place. Kelly was 15th, recording a time that placed him third with only Tournant to go. The French cyclist, favored to win, had the best first-half but finished slowly and came in outside the medals with the fifth-best time.

References

External links
Official Olympic Report

M
Cycling at the Summer Olympics – Men's track time trial
Track cycling at the 2000 Summer Olympics
Men's events at the 2000 Summer Olympics